is a railway station in Ebetsu, Hokkaidō, Japan. The station is numbered A06.

Lines
Oasa Station is served by Hakodate Main Line.

Station layout
The station consists of two ground-level opposed side platforms connected by a footbridge, serving two tracks. The station has automated ticket machines, automated turnstiles which accept Kitaca, and a "Midori no Madoguchi" staffed ticket office.

Platforms

Adjacent stations

References

Railway stations in Hokkaido Prefecture
Railway stations in Japan opened in 1966